Stenodema calcarata is a species of bug from Miridae family, that can be found in Europe and across the Palearctic to Central Asia, the Russian Far East, Siberia, northern China, Korea and Japan.

Description

Ecology
Stenodema calcarata lives on grasses including Agrostis tenuis, Alopecurus pratensis, Festuca and in bogs Molinia caerulea and many other grasses (Poaceae), and also on (Cyperaceae) and (Juncaceae), such as sedges Carex, Scirpus and Juncus.  
The species hibernates in winter, and come aground in April. During this time, the females start to change colour to green, while males still remain yellow, or brown. The larvae appears by August.

References

Insects described in 1807
Taxa named by Carl Fredrik Fallén
Stenodemini